Eighth Wonder were an English pop band, formed in 1983 in London, initially composed of singer/model/actress Patsy Kensit, her brother Jamie Kensit, Steve Grantley, Geoff Beauchamp, Nigel Davis, Jake Walters and Lawrence Lewis. The band first enjoyed major success in Japan and Italy in 1985–87, before finally breaking through in the UK and across Europe in 1988, thanks to their hit single "I'm Not Scared".

Biography

Early years
Eighth Wonder's roots are with a band called Spice. In 1983, Jamie Kensit auditioned his sister Patsy Kensit, then aged 15, for the vacant job of lead singer in his new band. The line-up consisted of her on vocals, Jamie Kensit and Geoff Beauchamp on guitar, Lawrence Lewis on bass, Jake Walters on drums and Nigel Davis on percussion. Spice made their live debut in autumn 1983, and then spent the next year playing further gigs, hoping to gain some attention from record labels.

In late 1984, Davis left to start the band 'Slipstream' and keyboard-player Alex Godson joined the band. They renamed themselves Eighth Wonder and Patsy Kensit began to write songs for the band. Their first gig as Eighth Wonder was in November 1984 in Wimbledon, London and further gigs followed, including at Queen Elizabeth College in Kensington. It was at one of these that Stephen Woolley, co-owner of Palace Films, and director Julien Temple offered Patsy Kensit the role of 'Crepe Suzette' in their 1986 movie musical Absolute Beginners. Eighth Wonder contributed a song to the soundtrack.

Success in Japan and Italy
In April 1985, Eighth Wonder was signed by CBS Records and began recording in London, working around Patsy Kensit's filming on Absolute Beginners. In October 1985, with the filming completed, Eighth Wonder's first single "Stay With Me" was released and achieved success in Japan, where it reached No. 1 and Italy, where it peaked at No. 4 in early 1986. It charted only at No. 65 in the UK Singles Chart. Shortly after, Lewis and Walters left. The band then started using drum machines and using keyboards for their bass sound.

In August 1986, they went to Los Angeles to record new tracks for their debut album, Fearless. There they worked with producer Mike Chapman, best known for his work with Blondie. They were also approached by many songwriters, including Dave Stewart of the Eurythmics (although the song was eventually not used) and Billy Steinberg and Tom Kelly, writers of many hit singles including Cyndi Lauper's "True Colors", Whitney Houston's "So Emotional" and Madonna's "Like a Virgin".

In February 1987, one of the Chapman-produced tracks, "Will You Remember", was released in the United Kingdom but only reached No. 83 - though it reached the Top 10 in Italy, after a memorable performance at the Sanremo Music Festival, when a wardrobe malfunction caused Patsy to expose one of her nipples, live on TV. In Japan, the band achieved another No. 1 hit with another Chapman production, "When The Phone Stops Ringing", which was written by Holly Knight and Bernie Taupin. The song was also a Top 30 hit in Italy. "Will You Remember" was successfully released as a follow-up single in Japan. This was in turn followed by Brilliant Dreams, a Japanese exclusive mini album containing the singles and b-sides.

Success in the UK
Whilst completing their first album, the band had another line-up change, with Godson being replaced by drummer Steve Grantley. They worked with sound engineer, mixer and producer Pete Hammond, with the exception of one track, "I'm Not Scared", co-produced and written by the Pet Shop Boys and Phil Harding. Chosen as the next single for release in Europe, it was greeted with media and public enthusiasm. "I'm Not Scared" became a Top 10 hit in almost every country in Europe, achieving No. 1 in Italy, No. 2 in Switzerland and Portugal, No. 3 in Spain, No. 4 in Greece, No. 5 in Germany, No. 7 in the UK, No. 8 in France and No. 20 in Austria. Pet Shop Boys recorded their own version of the song for their album Introspective.

May 1988 saw the release of another single, "Cross My Heart", which proved to be almost as successful chart-wise as "I'm Not Scared" (No. 6 in Switzerland, No. 10 in Italy, No. 13 in UK, and France, and No. 56 in the US - where it was their only Top 75 single).

Eighth Wonder's album Fearless followed in July 1988, and by October it had achieved almost 500,000 sales internationally.

However, the follow-up single "Baby Baby" only got to No. 65 in the UK Singles Chart and would be their last hit in Italy, peaking at No. 13. They had one more hit in Japan with "Use Me" in 1989 and, shortly after this, the band parted ways and Patsy Kensit began to focus on her marriage and acting career. In 1988, Hong Kong singer Elvina Kong covered "Baby Baby" in Cantonese.

Discography

Albums

Studio albums

Compilation albums

Singles

References

External links
[ Allmusic.com biography]

English pop music groups
Musical groups established in 1983
Musical groups disestablished in 1989
Musical groups from London
Sony Music artists